Lisabad (also Romanized as Līsābād) is a village in Taftan-e Jonubi Rural District, Nukabad District, Khash County, Sistan and Baluchestan Province, Iran. At the 2006 census, its population was 85, in 12 families.

References 

Populated places in Khash County